The Montagnes Noires (Black Mountains) are a range of mountains in central Haiti.

References

Mountain ranges of Haiti